Stream bed is the channel bottom of a stream or river or creek.

Riverbed may also refer to:

Wadi, a dry riverbed that contains water only during times of heavy rain
Riverbed Technology, an American technology company
Riverbeds (band), a Canadian post-rock band